The Play-offs of the 2000 Fed Cup Americas Zone Group II were the final stages of the Group II Zonal Competition involving teams from the Americas. Using the positions determined in their pools, the fourteen teams faced off to determine their overall placing in the 2000 Fed Cup Americas Group II. The top two teams (i.e. the teams that won matches in the first round of the top quarter) advanced to Group I next year.

Draw

First round

Dominican Republic vs. Puerto Rico

Bolivia vs. Ecuador

Trinidad and Tobago vs. El Salvador

Guatemala vs. Bahamas

Barbados vs. Costa Rica

Bermuda vs. Panama

Antigua and Barbuda vs. Jamaica

Repechage Round

Puerto Rico vs. Bolivia

Trinidad and Tobago vs. Guatemala

Barbados vs. Panama

Second round

Dominican Republic vs. Ecuador

El Salvador vs. Bahamas

Costa Rica vs. Bermuda

Final Placements

  and  advanced to Group I for next year, where they both placed last in their respective pools of four and five. Thus both teams were relegated back to Group II for 2002.

See also
Fed Cup structure

References

External links
 Fed Cup website

2000 Fed Cup Americas Zone